Jean de Vienne (died 4 August 1351), was a 14th-century French noble.

Life
Vienne was a son of Philippe de Vienne, lord of Pagny. He was the French commander of Mortagne in 1340 and governor of Calais during the siege of Calais undertaken by King Edward III of England starting on 4 September 1346. After a long siege, Jean was forced to capitulate on 3 August 1347.

Jean was married to Catherine de Jonvelle. He died on 4 August 1351 in Paris, France.

References

Citations

Bibliography 
 

1351 deaths
14th-century French people
Medieval French knights